You Better Weaponize is the second studio album by American rapper Guante and producer Big Cats!. It was released by Tru Ruts on Election Day, November 6, 2012.

Release 
Upcoming to the album's release, the duo released a music video for the song "To Young Leaders" via Guante's YouTube channel. Later, the song was picked up by Strange Famous Records and released for free on their website.

Track listing

References

2012 albums
Hip hop albums by American artists